The Boy Who Followed Ripley is a 1980 psychological thriller by Patricia Highsmith, the fourth in her series about career criminal Tom Ripley. In this book, Ripley continues living quietly on his French estate, Belle Ombre, only obliquely involved in criminal activity. His idyll is shaken when he meets a teenaged boy who is hiding from the police.

Plot summary
A 16-year-old American boy calling himself Billy approaches Tom Ripley in the French village near the latter's residence, asking for a job. Ripley agrees to give him a small amount of gardening work and puts him up in the guest room, but he believes that he recognizes the youth from a newspaper. Further investigation reveals that "Billy" is actually Frank Pierson, the son of a recently deceased American tycoon who has fled the United States. Frank soon confesses to Ripley that he did in fact murder his own father by pushing him off a cliff. Ripley recognizes a kindred spirit in Frank, discovering that he deliberately sought him out for advice after learning of his questionable reputation. Ripley commissions a false passport for Frank and they travel to West Berlin, where they stay with a friend of Ripley's erstwhile partner in crime, Reeves Minot.

Frank is kidnapped while strolling through a wooded area in West Berlin. Ripley communicates with the Pierson family and with a private detective the family has sent to Paris. The Piersons wire the ransom to West Berlin, and Ripley takes it to an appointed drop-off point where he impulsively kills one of the kidnappers. The other three drive off. Ripley returns with the money and arranges a rendezvous at a gay bar, which he infiltrates by dressing in drag. He identifies the kidnappers, who again leave empty-handed, and follows them back to the flat where they are keeping the boy. Ripley scares the amateur thugs into dashing out of the apartment, and he single-handedly rescues the semi-conscious hostage.

Ripley then dispatches the money back to the Pierson family, encourages Frank to return to his family in Kennebunkport, and accompanies him there besides. Despite Ripley's coaching and reassurances, Frank is overwhelmed by guilt as well as by his unrequited love for a teenaged girl named Teresa, and eventually commits suicide by throwing himself over the same precipice from which he pushed his father. Shaken and, much to his own surprise, saddened by Frank's death, Ripley returns to Belle Ombre after securing a former possession of the boy's as a memento.

Major themes
Highsmith sets the novel against the oppressive atmosphere of Cold War Germany, and the hedonism of West Berlin, in particular the gay bar scene. Ripley tolerates — and sympathizes with — the gay characters he encounters, in contrast to the self-loathing he felt due to his attraction to Dickie Greenleaf in The Talented Mr Ripley. Ripley's efforts in protecting Frank, and that stealing the ransom money does not even occur to him, indicate a form of emotionless compassion lacking in the character's behaviour in earlier books.

Adaptations

Radio
The 2009 BBC Radio 4 adaptation stars Ian Hart as Ripley, Nicholas Hoult as Frank and Helen Longworth as Heloise.

Notes

1980 American novels
Novels by Patricia Highsmith
Heinemann (publisher) books
Patricide in fiction
Novels about serial killers
Novels set in Berlin
Novels set in France
Novels set in New England
Novels set in Paris